Platyninae is a subfamily of ground beetles (family Carabidae).

Genera
The subfamily Platyninae contains about 250 genera organized into three tribes:

 Tribe Omphreini Ganglbauer, 1891
 Omphreus Dejean, 1828
 Tribe Platynini Bonelli, 1810
 Abacetodes Straneo, 1939
 Achaetocephala Habu, 1975
 Achaetoprothorax Habu, 1978
 Aepsera Chaudoir, 1874
 Agelaea Gené, 1839
 Agonidium Jeannel, 1948
 Agonobembix Jeannel, 1948
 Agonoriascus Basilewsky, 1985
 Agonorites Jeannel, 1951
 Agonum Bonelli, 1810
 Altagonum Darlington, 1952
 Anchomenus Bonelli, 1810
 Andinocolpodes Perrault, 1991
 Andrewesius Andrewes, 1939
 Aparupa Andrewes, 1930
 Archagonum Basilewsky, 1953
 Archicolpodes J.Schmidt, 2001
 Arhytinus Bates, 1889
 Atranodes Jedlicka, 1953
 Atranus LeConte, 1847
 Austroglyptolenus Roig-Juñent, 2003
 Beckeria Jedlicka, 1931
 Blackburnia Sharp, 1878
 Bothrocolpodes Basilewsky, 1985
 Bruskespar Morvan, 1998
 Bruskmoal Morvan, 1998
 Bryanites Valentine, 1987
 Callidagonum Lorenz, 1998
 Cardiomera Bassi, 1834
 Catacolpodes Basilewsky, 1985
 Celaenagonum Habu, 1978
 Chaetagonum Burgeon, 1933
 Chaetosaurus J.Schmidt, 2001
 Cinctagonum Baehr, 2012
 Cistelagonum Baehr, 2012
 Collagonum Baehr, 1995
 Colpodes W.S.MacLeay, 1825
 Colpoides Jedlicka, 1931
 Colpomimus Basilewsky, 1985
 Colposphodrus Jedlicka, 1953
 Ctenognathus Fairmaire, 1843
 Cymenopterus Jeannel, 1948
 Cyrtopilus Basilewsky, 1985
 Dalatagonum Fedorenko, 2011
 Deliaesianum Morvan, 1999
 Deltocolpodes Morvan, 1992
 Dendragonum Jeannel, 1948
 Diacanthostylus Habu, 1978
 Dicranoncoides Habu, 1978
 Dicranoncus Chaudoir, 1850
 Dinocolpodes J.Schmidt, 2001
 Dirotus W.S.MacLeay, 1825
 Dister Morvan, 2006
 Dolichocolpodes Basilewsky, 1985
 Dyscolus Dejean, 1831
 Elliptoleus Bates, 1882
 Enoicus Péringuey, 1896
 Epicolpodes Basilewsky, 1985
 Eucolpodes Jeannel, 1948
 Euleptus Klug, 1833
 Euplynes Schmidt-Goebel, 1846
 Feroniascus Jeannel, 1951
 Fortagonum Darlington, 1952
 Galiciotyphlotes Assmann, 1999
 Gastragonum Darlington, 1952
 Glaucagonum Habu, 1978
 Glyptolenoides Perrault, 1991
 Glyptolenus Bates, 1878
 Gyrochaetostylus Habu, 1978
 Habragonum Ueno, 1964
 Hannaphota Landin, 1955
 Haplocolpodes Jeannel, 1951
 Haplopeza Boheman, 1848
 Helluocolpodes Liebherr, 2005
 Hemiplatynus Casey, 1920
 Henvelik Morvan, 1999
 Herculagonum Baehr, 2002
 Hikosanoagonum Habu, 1954
 Idiagonum Darlington, 1952
 Idiastes Andrewes, 1931
 Idiocolpodes Basilewsky, 1985
 Incagonum Liebherr, 1994
 Iridagonum Darlington, 1952
 Ischnagonum Kasahara & Satô, 1997
 Jocqueius Basilewsky, 1988
 Jujiroa Ueno, 1952
 Kalchdigor Morvan, 1999
 Kar Morvan, 1998
 Karnes Morvan, 2010
 Kaszabellus Jedlicka, 1954
 Kiwiplatynus Larochelle & Larivière, 2021
 Klapperichella Jedlicka, 1956
 Kuceraianum Morvan, 2002
 Kupeplatynus Larochelle & Larivière, 2021
 Laevagonum Darlington, 1952
 Lassalleianum Morvan, 1999
 Lepcha Andrewes, 1930
 Leptagonum Kolbe, 1897
 Leptocolpodes Basilewsky, 1985
 Letouzeya Bruneau de Miré, 1982
 Liagonum Jeannel, 1948
 Liamegalonychus Basilewsky, 1963
 Liocolpodes Basilewsky, 1985
 Lissagonum Habu, 1978
 Lithagonum Darlington, 1952
 Lobocolpodes Basilewsky, 1985
 Lorostema Motschulsky, 1865
 Loxocrepis Eschscholtz, 1829
 Lucicolpodes J.Schmidt, 2000
 Maculagonum Darlington, 1952
 Maoriplatynus Larochelle & Larivière, 2021
 Meleagros Kirschenhofer, 1999
 Mesocolpodes Basilewsky, 1985
 Metacolpodes Jeannel, 1948
 Mexisphodrus Barr, 1965
 Montagonum Darlington, 1952
 Mooreagonum Baehr, 2016
 Morimotoidius Habu, 1954
 Nebriagonum Darlington, 1952
 Negreum Habu, 1958
 Neobatenus Jeannel, 1948
 Neocolpodes Jeannel, 1948
 Neodendragonum Basilewsky, 1953
 Neomegalonychus Jeannel, 1948
 Nesiocolpodes Jeannel, 1948
 Nipponagonum Habu, 1978
 Notagonum Darlington, 1952
 Notocolpodes Basilewsky, 1985
 Notoplatynus B.Moore, 1985
 Nymphagonum Habu, 1978
 Olisthopus Dejean, 1828
 Oncostylus Habu, 1978
 Onotokiba Alluaud, 1927
 Onycholabis Bates, 1873
 Onypterygia Dejean, 1831
 Orophicus Alluaud, 1925
 Orthotrichus Peyron, 1856
 Oxygonium Basilewsky, 1951
 Oxypselaphus Chaudoir, 1843
 Pachybatenus Basilewsky, 1973
 Pachyferonia Jeannel, 1951
 Paracolpodes Basilewsky, 1985
 Paraliagonum Basilewsky, 1957
 Paramegalonychus Basilewsky, 1953
 Paranchodemus Habu, 1978
 Paranchus Lindroth, 1974
 Paraplatynus Baehr, 2016
 Pawgammm Morvan, 1999
 Platyagonum Habu, 1978
 Platynus Bonelli, 1810
 Plaumannium Liebke, 1939
 Plicagonum Darlington, 1952
 Ponapagonum Darlington, 1970
 Potamagonum Darlington, 1952
 Praepristus Kirschenhofer, 1999
 Promecoptera Dejean, 1831
 Promegalonychus Basilewsky, 1953
 Prophenorites Basilewsky, 1985
 Prosphodrus Britton, 1959
 Protocolpodes Basilewsky, 1985
 Pseudanchomenus Tarnier, 1860
 Pseudobatenus Basilewsky, 1951
 Pseudomegalonychus Basilewsky, 1950
 Rhadine LeConte, 1846
 Rupa Jedlicka, 1935
 Scotagonum Habu, 1978
 Sericoda Kirby, 1837
 Shibataia Habu, 1978
 Sinocolpodes J.Schmidt, 2001
 Skoeda Morvan, 1995
 Skorlagad Morvan, 1999
 Skouedhirraad Morvan, 1999
 Sophroferonia Alluaud, 1933
 Speagonum B.Moore, 1977
 Speocolpodes Barr, 1974
 Speokokosia Alluaud, 1932
 Sperkanhir Morvan, 2010
 Stenocnemus Mannerheim, 1837
 Straneoa Basilewsky, 1953
 Syletor Tschitscherine, 1899
 Takasagoagonum Habu, 1977
 Tanystoma Motschulsky, 1845
 Tarsagonum Darlington, 1952
 Tetraleucus Casey, 1920
 Tostkar Morvan, 1998
 Trogloagonum Casale, 1982
 Tuiplatynus Larochelle & Larivière, 2021
 Vitagonum B.Moore, 1999
 Vulcanophilus Heller, 1898
 Xestagonum Habu, 1978
 †Praeanchodemus Schmidt et al.
 Tribe Sphodrini Laporte, 1834
 Subtribe Atranopsina Baehr, 1982
 Amaroschema Jeannel, 1943
 Amphimasoreus Piochard de la Brûlerie, 1875
 Atranopsis Baehr, 1982
 Broter Andrewes, 1923
 Gomerina Bolivar y Pieltain, 1940
 Paraeutrichopus Mateu, 1954
 Platyderus Stephens, 1827
 Pseudomyas Uyttenboogaart, 1929
 Pseudoplatyderus Bolivar y Pieltain, 1940
 Subtribe Calathina Laporte, 1834
 Calathus Bonelli, 1810
 Thermoscelis Putzeys, 1873
 Subtribe Dolichina Brullé, 1834
 Acalathus Semenov, 1889
 Anchomenidius Heyden, 1880
 Casaleius Sciaky & Wrase, 1998
 Dolichus Bonelli, 1810
 Doliodactyla Sciaky & Wrase, 1998
 Morphodactyla Semenov, 1889
 Xestopus Andrewes, 1937
 Subtribe Pristosiina Lindroth, 1956
 Pristosia Motschulsky, 1865
 Subtribe Sphodrina Laporte, 1834
 Calathidius Putzeys, 1873
 Cephalosdrophus Lassalle & Marcilhac, 1999
 Eosphodrus Casale, 1988
 Eremosphodrus Semenov, 1909
 Himalosphodrus Casale, 1988
 Hystricosphodrus Casale & Giachino, 2004
 Ifridytes Deuve & Queinnec, 1994
 Laemostenus Bonelli, 1810
 Licinopsis Bedel, 1899
 Miquihuana Barr, 1982
 Pseudotaphoxenus L.Schaufuss, 1865
 Reflexisphodrus Casale, 1988
 Sphodropsis Seidlitz, 1887
 Sphodrus Clairville, 1806
 Stenolepta Semenov, 1889
 Taphoxenus Motschulsky, 1850
 Subtribe Synuchina Lindroth, 1956
 Nipponosynuchus Morita, 1998
 Parabroscus Lindroth, 1956
 Synuchus Gyllenhal, 1810
 Trephionus Bates, 1883

References

 
Carabidae subfamilies